Maria Magnólia de Souza Figueiredo (born 11 November 1963 in Currais Novos, Rio Grande do Norte) is a retired Brazilian athlete who competed in the 400 and 800 metres. She represented her country at the 1988 and 1996 Summer Olympics, as well as four World Championships.

She has personal bests of 22.99 in the 200 metres (1988) and 50.62 in the 400 metres (1990). The latter is the current national record. Her time of 53.05 set in 2004 at altitude is the current Women's Masters 400 metres world record over the age of 40.

Competition record

References

1963 births
Living people
People from Natal, Rio Grande do Norte
Brazilian female sprinters
Brazilian female middle-distance runners
Athletes (track and field) at the 1987 Pan American Games
Athletes (track and field) at the 1991 Pan American Games
Athletes (track and field) at the 1988 Summer Olympics
Athletes (track and field) at the 1996 Summer Olympics
Olympic athletes of Brazil
World Athletics Championships athletes for Brazil
Pan American Games athletes for Brazil
Olympic female sprinters
Sportspeople from Rio Grande do Norte
20th-century Brazilian women